City of Industry is a city in the San Gabriel Valley, in eastern Los Angeles County, California, United States. The city is almost entirely industrial, containing over 3,000 businesses employing 67,000 people, with only 264 residents as of the 2020 census, making it the third least populous city in the state. It was incorporated on June 18, 1957, and has become the economic hub for the San Gabriel Valley.

Geography

History

In 1841, William and Nicolasa Workman, who emigrated with John Rowland and others, received a land grant for Rancho La Puente from the governor of Alta California, Juan Bautista Alvarado. The ranch eventually grew to almost 49,000 acres. The Workmans quickly established themselves as cattle ranchers and did well financially during the Gold Rush, supplying fresh beef to the gold fields. Following the discovery of oil by their son on land they owned in the Montebello hills, the Workmans' grandson, Walter P. Temple, and his wife, Laura, bought the Workman House and surrounding land in 1917. This property is now known as the Workman and Temple Family Homestead Museum and is a museum and heritage site in present-day City of Industry that is free and open to the public. In the 1910s, Tract 1343 was created and shows a large portion of 2017's City boundaries.

The City of Industry was incorporated as a charter city on June 18, 1957. A little under fifteen years from its incorporation, the City of Industry created a general plan to guide its future development. The 1971 document remains in effect as of 2020, nearly a half century later. The plan was overseen by planning consultants Gruen Associates, a firm established in 1950 by Austrian-born Victor Gruen, a visionary architect and urban planner.

The City of Industry was named for the goals and objectives section of the general plan which identified the primary goal of the city as "creating and maintaining an ideal setting for manufacturing, distribution and industrial facilities."

In 1962, the City of Industry Chamber of Commerce formed and in 1974, the Workman House became a historical landmark. 
In 1979/1980 a former landfill near Azusa Avenue was converted into the Industry Hills Golf Club, including a hotel and the Eisenhower golf course. 
In 1981, the Industry Hills Expo Center opened as a community multi-purpose event facility.

In 1985, the inaugural Charity Pro Rodeo took place, to raise funds for youth in the San Gabriel Valley. The Rodeo still takes place annually. In 1991, in partnership with the Los Angeles County Sheriff's Department, the Youth Activities League was formed to offer sports to at-risk children as an alternative to gang activity.

In recognition of the importance of mass transit, the city invested heavily in the development of a Metrolink transit station near the confluence of the 60 and 57 freeways and in 1993, the City of Industry Metrolink Station opened. In 2004, the Environmental Impact Report and Design for the 57/60 Confluence Project was completed. The three-phased program of improvements consists of ramp and interchange reconfigurations as well as the addition of bypass lanes to reduce weaving, resulting in less congestion for the sixth-worst congested and dangerous freeway interchange in the nation.

Government and infrastructure

The Los Angeles County Department of Health Services operates the Pomona Health Center in Pomona, serving Industry.

The United States Postal Service City of Industry Post Office is located at 15559 Rausch Rd.

City of Industry's City Council members, composed of five members, are elected at large and the elections are held on a Tuesday after the first Monday in June of odd-numbered years. The city is opposing California's Senate Bill 415—whose purpose is to counteract low voter turnout—which would force it to change election dates to coincide with Los Angeles County, California, and federal elections in even-numbered years (March effective in 2020 or November).

Emergency services
The Los Angeles County Sheriff's Department operates the Industry Station in the City of Industry.

Economy

The city's zoning is primarily devoted to business: 92% is industrial, 8% is commercial. The few residences in the city either existed before incorporation, are on properties adjacent to either Industry Hills Golf Club, Industry Hills Recreation Center or in the small neighborhood adjacent to City Hall. In addition, there are residents at the El Encanto Healthcare Center, a nursing home owned by the city.

The City of Industry has no business taxes and is primarily funded through retail sales tax from shopping centers located within the city limits, and property tax on parcels within the city. The city has the highest property tax rate in Los Angeles County, at 1.92%. In addition, there is a revenue-generating hillside hotel resort, known as the Pacific Palms Resort (formerly the Industry Hills Sheraton), which is almost completely surrounded by the city of La Puente but actually located in the City of Industry.

City of Industry is a popular investment area for Chinese businesspeople and the city has also emerged as a high-tech import/export center for computer parts, with business links to the Asian marketplace. For convenience many Chinese entrepreneurs and staff live in nearby Rowland Heights, Hacienda Heights, West Covina, Diamond Bar and Walnut.

Businesses

Some of the companies with headquarters in the City of Industry are:
Alta Dena
AMI ClubWear
Antec
Arconic
CSC Enterprise Corp.
CyberPowerPC
Dacor (kitchen appliances)
DUB
Emtek Products
Engineering Model Associates/Plastruct
Gigabyte Technology Called GBT Co, Ltd. as its corporate name in the United States
Hot Topic
iStarUSA Group
ITC-Diligence, Inc.
 Jada Toys
 Jointown Pharmaceutical Group
Medlock Industries
Metro United Bank (a subsidiary of MetroCorp Bancshares)
Newegg.com
NZXT
Public Health Foundation Enterprises, Inc.
Serec of California
Utility Trailer Manufacturing Company
Yum-Yum Donuts

Other businesses with a major presence in the City of Industry include:
Biostar
Bank of the West
CoolerMaster
DIRECTV
Fashion Nova
FedEx
Golden State Foods (two locations)
Goya Foods' California division
Health One Pharmaceuticals
Kellwood Company
Lee Kum Kee USA Los Angeles Office
Micro-Star International stylized as MSI
Silverstone Technology

Demographics

2010
At the 2010 census, the City of Industry had a population of 219. The population density was 18.2 people per square mile (7.0/km2). The population was 58.9% White (37.9% Non-Hispanic White), 0.5% Black or African American, and 8.2% Asian. Hispanics or Latinos of any race made up 52.5% of the population.

The census reported that 214 people (98% of the population) lived in households, 5 (2%) lived in non-institutionalized group quarters, and none were institutionalized.

There were 69 households, 32 (46%) had children under the age of 18 living in them, 37 (54%) were opposite-sex married couples living together, 7 (10%) had a female householder with no husband present, 9 (13%) had a male householder with no wife present. There were 3 (4%) unmarried opposite-sex partnerships, and 2 (3%) same-sex married couples or partnerships. Twelve households (17%) were one person and 6 (9%) had someone living alone who was 65 or older. The average household size was 3.1. There were 53 families (77% of households); the average family size was 3.6.

The population was spread out by age with 59 people (27%) under the age of 18, 25 people (11%) aged 18 to 24, 51 people (23%) aged 25 to 44, 62 people (28%) aged 45 to 64, and 22 people (10%) who were 65 or older. The median age was 37.5 years. For every 100 females, there were 108.6 males. For every 100 females age 18 and over, there were 102.5 males.

There were 73 housing units at an average density of 6.1 per square mile, of the occupied units 22 (32%) were owner-occupied and 47 (68%) were rented. The homeowner vacancy rate was 0%; the rental vacancy rate was 6%. Sixty-six people (30% of the population) lived in owner-occupied housing units and 148 people (68%) lived in rental housing units.

According to the 2010 United States Census, the City of Industry had a median household income of $49,329, with 1.0% of the population living below the federal poverty line.

Education
The city is served by multiple school districts:
 Hacienda La Puente Unified School District
Workman High School is in the City of Industry
 Bassett Unified School District
 Rowland Unified School District
 Walnut Valley Unified School District
 Pomona Unified School District

Bishop Amat Memorial High School in La Puente, of the Roman Catholic Archdiocese of Los Angeles, is in proximity to Industry.

Nearby community colleges include Mt. San Antonio College and Rio Hondo College.

Public safety
The Los Angeles County Sheriff's Department has a regional station on Hudson Avenue, just off Hacienda Boulevard which services the city and the neighboring cities of La Habra Heights, La Puente, and the unincorporated communities of Avocado Heights, Valinda, Bassett, Hacienda Heights and North Whittier (Spyglass/Rose Hills).
The Los Angeles County Fire Department uses two stations (#118 on Gale Avenue, and Station #43 on Stimson Avenue on the west side of town).

According to the 2011 FBI uniform crime reports, with a population of 222, the City of Industry had 1,136 known property crimes, giving it the highest average per-resident property crime rate (5.117) in California. The average property crime rate for the entire US that year was 0.029. The same report indicates 44 violent crimes, giving it the second highest per-resident violent crime rate (0.198) in California.

Landmarks

Workman and Temple Homestead Museum
The Workman and Temple Family Homestead Museum is a historic house and gardens museum of 19th-century and early-20th-century Southern California history and architecture, and of the generations of the Workman-Temple family that were influential here and in the region. The property is entered on the National Register of Historic Places.

Film industry
The City of Industry is the home of the Puente Hills Mall, a major shopping center that was the Twin Pines/Lone Pine Mall in the Back to the Future movie series. Adjacent to the mall's property is a SpeedZone entertainment center, which was featured in a prominent scene of Kevin Smith's Clerks II. A former IKEA store (opened as the first STØR location in 1987) located north of the Puente Hills Mall and across the State Route 60 freeway was used as a shooting location for the final fight scene in Mr. & Mrs Smith. Its exterior was renovated so it could be used for both exterior and interior filming. Another movie called Fun with Dick and Jane was filmed as a fictional retail store KostMart (a parody of Costco Wholesale). The building was later demolished. The IKEA store later moved to a bigger location in Covina, California, which opened in 2003.

The City of Industry also features a fake McDonald's restaurant that is used strictly for filming movies and commercials, which is inside the 30-mile studio zone. Also in the city is Vineland Drive-In, one of only two operating drive-in theaters in Los Angeles and Orange County. The city-owned Industry Hills Expo Center is also used for filming.

References

Further reading

External links

City of Industry, California
1957 establishments in California
Cities in Los Angeles County, California
Communities in the San Gabriel Valley
Incorporated cities and towns in California
Populated places established in 1957